Harrison Township is one of seventeen townships in Kosciusko County, Indiana. As of the 2010 census, its population was 3,587 and it contained 1,538 housing units.

Harrison Township was organized in 1838.

Geography

Cities and towns
 Mentone (north side)

Unincorporated towns
 Palestine at 
(This list is based on USGS data and may include former settlements.)

Education
Harrison Township residents may obtain a free library card from the Bell Memorial Public Library in Mentone.

References

External links
 Indiana Township Association
 United Township Association of Indiana

Townships in Kosciusko County, Indiana
Townships in Indiana